Jean-Jacques Barthe (27 June 1936 – 10 June 2022) was a French politician.

Biography
A teacher by occupation, Barthe joined the French Communist Party (PCF) in 1961, where he became a member of the Calais local office in 1963. He served on Calais's municipal council from March 1969 until his election as mayor in 1971. He resigned from this position on 27 March 2000 after nearly 30 years of service.

Barthe was elected to the National Assembly in 1973, where he represented Pas-de-Calais's 7th constituency. He was also General Councilor of the Canton of Calais-Centre from 1973 to 1979.

Jean-Jacques Barthe died in Calais on 10 June 2022, at the age of 85.

Decorations
 Knight of the National Order of Merit (2001)[5]

References

1936 births
2022 deaths
20th-century French politicians
20th-century French educators
People from Calais
French Communist Party politicians
Departmental councillors (France)
Mayors of places in Hauts-de-France
Deputies of the 5th National Assembly of the French Fifth Republic
Deputies of the 6th National Assembly of the French Fifth Republic
Deputies of the 7th National Assembly of the French Fifth Republic
Deputies of the 8th National Assembly of the French Fifth Republic
Members of the Parliamentary Assembly of the Council of Europe
Knights of the Ordre national du Mérite